The 2022 Junior World Weightlifting Championships were held in Heraklion, Greece, from 2 to 10 May 2022.

Medalists

Men

Women

Medal table
Ranking by Big (Total result) medals 

Ranking by all medals: Big (Total result) and Small (Snatch and Clean & Jerk)

Team ranking

Men

Women

Participating nations 
293 athletes from 58 countries:

  (2)
  (3)
  (9)
  (6)
  (1)
  (1)
  (2)
  (1)
  (2)
  (2)
  (5)
  (5)
  (7)
  (3)
  (2)
  (6)
  (6)
  (11)
  (3)
  (1)
  (5)
  (2)
  (6)
  (20) (Host)
  (2)
  (2)
  (8)
  (4)
  (2)
  (2)
  (1)
  (5)
  (3)
  (8)
  (1)
  (1)
  (10)
  (3)
  (3)
  (6)
  (1)
  (2)
  (1)
  (1)
  (12)
  (6)
  (3)
  (10)
  (6)
  (2)
  (1)
  (7)
  (8)
  (18)
  (13)
  (19)
  (6)
  (5)

Belarusian and Russian weightlifters will not compete at the event after a ban as a result of the Russian invasion of Ukraine.

Most participants

Men's results

Men's 55 kg

Men's 61 kg

Men's 67 kg

Men's 73 kg

Men's 81 kg

Men's 89 kg

Men's 96 kg

Men's 102 kg

Men's 109 kg

Men's +109 kg

Women's results

Women's 45 kg

Women's 49 kg

Women's 55 kg

Women's 59 kg

Women's 64 kg

Women's 71 kg

Women's 76 kg

Women's 81 kg

Women's 87 kg

Women's +87 kg

References

External links
 Results Book: 2022 IWF Junior World Championships

IWF Junior World Weightlifting Championships
International weightlifting competitions hosted by Greece
World Junior Weightlifting Championships
World Junior Weightlifting Championships
Sport in Heraklion
Weightlifting